Cal Harris may refer to:
 Calvin Harris, Scottish DJ, record producer, singer, and songwriter
 Cal Harris Jr., American jazz musician, songwriter, and composer
 Cal Harris (engineer), American sound engineer